James Robert McTaggart (born March 31, 1960) is a Canadian former professional ice hockey player who played for the Washington Capitals. He was originally signed as a free agent by the Capitals in 1979 and played parts of two seasons with the club.  He was an assistant coach for the Seattle Thunderbirds through the 2012-13 season. McTaggart was born in Weyburn, Saskatchewan.

Career statistics

Awards
 WHL Second All-Star Team – 1980

External links

1960 births
Billings Bighorns players
Canadian ice hockey defencemen
Hershey Bears players
Ice hockey people from Saskatchewan
Living people
Moncton Alpines (AHL) players
Montana Magic players
Peterborough Pirates players
Saskatoon Blades players
Sportspeople from Weyburn
Swift Current Broncos players
Undrafted National Hockey League players
Washington Capitals players
Wichita Wind players